Alfred Van Landeghem was a Belgian coxswain who won silver medals in men's eight at the 1900 Summer Olympics and again in men's eight at the 1908 Summer Olympics as part of the Royal Club Nautique de Gand team.

References

External links

Belgian male rowers
Olympic rowers of Belgium
Olympic silver medalists for Belgium
Rowers at the 1900 Summer Olympics
Rowers at the 1908 Summer Olympics
Olympic medalists in rowing
Place of birth missing
Year of birth missing
Year of death missing
Coxswains (rowing)
Royal Club Nautique de Gand rowers
Medalists at the 1900 Summer Olympics
European Rowing Championships medalists
20th-century Belgian people